Pedro Yoma (April 28, 1927 – August 21, 2009) was a Chilean athlete. He competed in the Men's 400m Hurdles in the 1952 Summer Olympics. He also won bronze in the 1952 South American Championships in Athletics in the same event.

References

1927 births
2009 deaths
Chilean male hurdlers
Athletes (track and field) at the 1952 Summer Olympics
Olympic athletes of Chile